The 2009 Kraft Nabisco Championship was played April 2–5 at Mission Hills Country Club in Rancho Mirage, California. This was the 38th edition of the Kraft Nabisco Championship and the 27th as a women's major golf championship.

Brittany Lincicome, age 23, eagled the final hole to win her first major, one stroke ahead of runner-up  the victory was her third on the LPGA Tour. Down a stroke on the 72nd hole, Lincicome's second shot at the  par-5 stopped within  of the flagstick and she sank the putt. Defending champion Lorena Ochoa finished eight strokes back, tied for twelfth.

Past champions in the field

Made the cut

Missed the cut

Source:

Round summaries

First round
Thursday, April 2, 2009

Source:

Second round
Friday, April 3, 2009

Source:

Third round
Saturday, April 4, 2009

Source:

Final round
Sunday, April 5, 2009

Source:

Amateurs: Joh (+2), Thompson (+2), Muñoz (+7).

Scorecard
Final round

Cumulative tournament scores, relative to par
{|class="wikitable" span = 50 style="font-size:85%;
|-
|style="background: Red;" width=10|
|Eagle
|style="background: Pink;" width=10|
|Birdie
|style="background: PaleGreen;" width=10|
|Bogey
|style="background: Green;" width=10|
|Double bogey
|}

References

External links
Golf Channel - Down memory lane: Lincicome's Kraft win in '09

Chevron Championship
Golf in California
Kraft Nabisco Championship
Kraft Nabisco Championship
Kraft Nabisco Championship
Kraft Nabisco Championship